The Waiterimu Solar Farm is a proposed photovoltaic power station in the Waiterimu Valley, near Ohinewai in the Waikato District of New Zealand. The farm will be owned by Island Green Power Ltd. When complete the farm will cover 380 hectares and generate 300 GWh/year of electricity.

The project has been opposed by local residents.

See also

 Solar power in New Zealand

References

Solar power in New Zealand
Proposed renewable energy power stations in New Zealand
Waikato District